Sporting Club Chabab Mohammédia, known as Chabab Mohammédia, is a Moroccan professional football club based in the city of Mohammedia, currently playing in Botola Pro Inwi. It is the most popular club in the city of Mohammedia, and it remains in the hall of fame of Moroccan football thanks to its players' remarkable role in the 1976 African Cup of Nations won by the Moroccan national team.

History
Although the club was founded in 1948, it is considered the first club in the city in terms of titles and achievements as well as the popular base compared to Ittihad Mohammedia, created a year before.

Adopted until today, the club has chosen a red and black striped jersey as its official colors, considered one of the most beautiful and charismatic jerseys in national football of all time.

The SCCM was founded by passionated men who could not bear the emptiness left by the withdrawal of the Fedala Sport team after France ended its protectorat on Morocco in 1956.

Thus, the club played in the second division before joining the national elite under the banner of the Royal Football Federation. This promotion was acquired at the end of the 1959–1960 season.

The SCCM had its best period in the 1970s and 1980s. During its golden age, the club was one of the main providers of the national selection which won the only African Cup of Nations on its list of achievements until 'to today: The African Ballon d'Or and historical scorer of the national selection Ahmed Faras, Hassan Amcharrat Tahar Raâd and other players of the golden generation to name a few ...

The quest for the first championship title was carried out in 1980, after winning two Throne Cup titles, the Moroccan domestic cup in 1972 and 1975.

After playing in the Moroccan First Division in 2008–09, in the 2018–19 season Mohammedia was playing in the third division.

The "Comeback" of Chabab Mohammedia
Chabab Mohammedia, coached by former club and international Rachid Rokki managed the promotion four rounds before the National Amateur League season ended. Mohammedia finished the season as the most scoring (37 goals) and the fewest goals conceded (16 goals) for a total assessment of 16 victories, 6 draws and 4 defeats.

In January 2019 the club announced that Rivaldo will join the club as technical director once promoted to the professional second league, and would become the club's head coach starting from the 2019–20 season. However, Marco Simone became the club's manager in July 2019 and Rivaldo was appointed as a club's counsellor.

Mohamed Amine Benhachem is the current coach of the club, assisted by Hicham Louissi.

Chabab Mohammedia is playing its 40th season in the Botola Pro.

Stadium
Bachir Stadium, is the historical stadium of the club.

The stadium bore the name "Bachir" after Chabab Mohammedia's player during the 1950s and 1960s, Sir Abdessalam Bachir, a promising player who died in a tragic accident.

Bachir Stadium was shared with Union de Mohammédia who is now hosting its Amateur league matches in Alia Stadium, located in the eastern side of the city.

Current squad

Honours

National
Botola
Winners: 1979–80

Moroccan Throne Cup
Winners: 1972, 1975
Runner-up: 1987, 1999

Moroccan Super Cup
Winners: 1975.

Maghreb Cup Winners Cup         
Winners: 1972–73.
Runner-up: 1974–75.

References

 
Football clubs in Morocco
1948 establishments in Morocco
Mohammedia
Association football clubs established in 1948